Al Hamriyah Sports Club is a professional football club based in Al Hamriyah, Sharjah, United Arab Emirates. They play in the UAE Division One.

History
Al Hamriyah joined the UAE Division One in the 2008/09 season.

Current squad 

As of UAE Division One:

References

Football clubs in the United Arab Emirates